Blaubeuren is a town in the district of Alb-Donau near Ulm in Baden-Württemberg, Germany.

 it had 11,963 inhabitants.

Geography

Geographical location

Neighboring communities
The city is borders to the north to Suppingen and Berghülen, on the east to Blaustein, in the south to Ulm and Erbach and in the west to Schelklingen and Heroldstatt.

Constituent
The city Blaubeuren consists of the districts Blaubeuren, Gerhausen, Altental, Asch, Beiningen, Pappelau, Beimerstetten, Sotzenhausen, Seißen, Wennenden, Sonderbuch and Weiler with the core city Blaubeuren and 18 other villages, hamlets, farms and (individual) houses.

Castles 
Within the town borough are the ruins of a number of castles: Ruck Castle and Blauenstein Castle, Hohengerhausen Castle (in Gerhausen), Günzelburg Castle and Burkartsweiler (both in Seißen), Sirgenstein Castle (in Weiler), and Gleißenburg Castle (in Beiningen).

Coat of arms
The coat of arms for the town shows the so-called Blaumännle (little blue man), a small man dressed in blue on a gold background.

Economy and infrastructure

Companies
The Merckle group (pharmaceutical industry) is headquartered in Blaubeuren. Blaubeuren is also the headquarters of Centrotherm Photovoltaics.

Transport
Blaubeuren is located on the Ulm–Sigmaringen railway. Once an hour regional express trains run to Sigmaringen and Ulm, and every two hours to Donaueschingen and Titisee-Neustadt. Blaubeuren belongs to the Donau-Iller-Nahverkehrsverbund (DING).
Blaubeuren is located on the Bundesstraße 28 between Reutlingen and Ulm. In the city also begins the Bundesstraße 492 to Ehingen. The next junction of the Bundesautobahn 8 from Stuttgart to Munich is 12 kilometers (7 miles) away.

Religion
Blaubeuren is the seat of the church district Blaubeuren of the Evangelical-Lutheran Church in Württemberg. The Roman Catholic church Mariä Heimsuchung is located in Blaubeuren and has a branch church in Gerhausen. The New Apostolic Church also has here a municipality.

The Muslim community in Blaubeuren is largely Turkish dominated, originated by the migration of workers since the early 1960s from Turkey.

Buildings

Near the Blautopf lies the former Blaubeuren Abbey (founded in 1085).

Blaubeuren also has an old town with many half-timbered buildings.

Museums
The "Urgeschichtliches Museum Blaubeuren" displays archaeological findings, including the Venus of Hohle Fels, the earliest known undisputed example of a depiction of a human being in prehistoric art. Scientific findings, experimental archeology and modern museum education can be found under one roof.

The former bathhouse of the monks in the monastery presents in the basement  historic bathing facilities, and on the upper floors the local museum with furniture and objects from Blaubeuren.

Natural monuments
The most striking sight in Blaubeuren is the Blautopf, a karst spring. The  Blautopf is 21 meters deep and one of the deepest and largest sources in Germany, with a flow out of minimum 310 L/s and maximum 32,000 L/s.

Regular events
A unique sled race takes place in Gerhausen every year. In this event, known as the Patenterrennen (Patent Race), teams consisting of 'drivers' and 'brakesmen' compete against each other with their historic sleds.

Points of interest
Blautopf, source of the river Blau
Ruckenkreuz
Blaubeuren Abbey

Notable people from Blaubeuren

 Christoph Gottfried Bardili (1761–1808), philosopher
 Karl Philipp Conz (1762–1827), poet and writer, was a pupil of the monastery school in Blaubeuren
Matthäus Hipp (1813–1893), watchmaker and inventor
Wilhelm Friedrich von Drescher (1820–1897), Württembergian civil servant
Gustav Adolph Bockshammer (1824–1882), Württembegian civil servant
Hans Gassebner (1902–1966), painter and graphican
Wilhelm Schäfer (1902–1979), politician (NSDAP), district administrator in Crailsheim
Wolfgang Schürle (born 1941), politician (CDU), district administrator of Alb-Donau-Kreis
Rudolf Hausmann (born 1954), politician (SPD), Member of Landtag 1996–2011
René Okle (born 1983), footballer

Personalities who have worked in Blaubeuren 

 Adolf Merckle (1934–2009), entrepreneur, founder of the pharmaceutical company Ratiopharm
 Georg Hiller (born 1946), former mayor and since 2002 honorary citizen of Blaubeuren

References

External links
  

Towns in Baden-Württemberg
Alb-Donau-Kreis
Württemberg